Blue-sensitive opsin is a protein that in humans is encoded by the OPN1SW gene.

See also
 Opsin

References

Further reading

G protein-coupled receptors

Color vision